Uncial 0309 (in the Gregory-Aland numbering), is a Greek uncial manuscript of the New Testament.  Paleographically it had been assigned to the 6th-century.

Description 

The codex contains parts of six verses of the Gospels, on a fragment of one parchment leaf. Probably the original leaf was 18 cm by 13 cm. Only a small fragment 6 by 3 cm survives. Page verso is more legible. It contains the text of the Gospel of John 20:22-24,28-30.

It was written in one column per page, 27 lines per page, with only 6 lines surviving, in uncial letters. 

Currently it is dated by the INTF to the 6th-century.

It is currently housed at the Institut für die Altertumskunde of the University of Cologne (Inv. 806) in Cologne.

See also 

 List of New Testament uncials
 Biblical manuscripts
 Textual criticism

References

External links 
 "Continuation of the Manuscript List", Institute for New Testament Textual Research, University of Münster. Retrieved April 9, 2008

Greek New Testament uncials
6th-century biblical manuscripts